The Leonard Neighbor Farmstead is a historic house located at 177 West Mill Road near Long Valley in Washington Township, Morris County, New Jersey. It was added to the National Register of Historic Places on May 1, 1992, for its significance in architecture. The farm overlooks the valley formed by the South Branch Raritan River. The house is part of the Stone Houses and Outbuildings in Washington Township Multiple Property Submission (MPS).

History
Leonard Neighbor (1698–1766), born Leanhart Nachbar, was a Moravian settler who moved here in 1738. His great-grandson, Leonard Neighbor (1802–1880) purchased this subdivision in 1829. Leonard's brother, Jacob Wise Neighbor (1805–1889), owned the nearby Jacob Wise Neighbor House, also listed on the NRHP.

Description
The main house is a -story stone building with a hip roof. It was built  with Federal/Greek Revival style. The  property has five contributing buildings, including the main house, an English barn and a spring/wash house.

See also
 National Register of Historic Places listings in Morris County, New Jersey
 German Valley Historic District

Further reading

References

External links
 

Washington Township, Morris County, New Jersey
National Register of Historic Places in Morris County, New Jersey
Houses on the National Register of Historic Places in New Jersey
New Jersey Register of Historic Places
Houses in Morris County, New Jersey
Stone houses in New Jersey
Federal architecture in New Jersey
Greek Revival houses in New Jersey